Pandit Raghunath Seth (1931 – 15 February 2014) was a noted Indian exponent of Hindustani classical music through the medium of Bansuri, or bamboo flute; he was also a noted film score composer. He has received Sangeet Natak Akademi Award in 1994, given by Sangeet Natak Akademi, India's National Academy for Music, Dance and Drama.

Early life and training 
Born in Gwalior in 1931, he started his music training from his elder brother Kashi Prasad, at age of 12, and went on to train under eminent musicologist Dr. S. N. Ratanjankar and principal of Bhatkhande Music Institute (Bhatkande Sangeet Sansthan) in Lucknow. Later at the age of 19 he moved to Mumbai, where he learnt under Pandit Pannalal Ghosh of Maihar gharana.

Career 
As an Indian Classical Music Bamboo Flautist, he delighted his audiences and fans across the globe. His flute composition "Music to help you sleep" from the album Nidra has over 5.5 million views on YouTube.

His filmography included songs by stalwarts like Yesudas, Lata Mangeshkar, Asha Bhosle, Anuradha Paudwal, Chithra, Kavita Krishnamurty, Alka Yagnik, Bhupinder, Suresh Wadkar, Hariharan, Udit Narayan and more. "Yeh Paudhay Yeh Pattay", from the film "Ek Baar Phir", has been documented as Anuradha Paudwal's first film song.

His private albums included songs by Talat Mehmood, Asha Bhosle, Vani Jairam, Arti Mukherjee, Talat Aziz, Peenaz Masani, Sudha Malhotra, Hari Om Sharan and Sharma Bandhu.

He scored music for around 2000 documentary films and many television serials. Several of them like, 'Ocean to Sky, 'The Last Tiger', 'Mughal Gardens' & 'Death Sentence' were widely recognised for their music scores as well. He also composed songs for the 1988 Malayalam film 'Aaranyakam', directed by Malayalam film director Hariharan, with lyrics by the late Malayalam poet O. N. V. Kurup.

Pandit Raghunath Seth made many breakthroughs in the technique of flute making and playing. He is well known for adding a bamboo key to his bansuri that makes previously impossible phrases, such as the meend (Glissando) between Ma and Pa, easily playable. He also added an 8th hole which allows the player to extend the range of Indian bamboo flute, further into the lower octave.

As a flute guru, he has gifted the world with many fine disciples including: his son Apurva Shrivastava, Steve Gorn, Rao Kyao, Chris Hinze, Clive Bell, Sunil Gupta, Krishna Bhandari, Joshua Geisler, Chetan Joshi, Atul Sharma and Datta Chaughule.

He died on February 15, 2014, in Mumbai, at the age of 83.

References

External links 
 Rajhunath Seth at last.fm
 

1931 births
2014 deaths
Indian flautists
Recipients of the Sangeet Natak Akademi Award
Hindustani instrumentalists
Indian film score composers
People from Gwalior
Bansuri players
Hindustani composers
Indian classical composers
20th-century Indian musicians
Suns of Arqa members
20th-century flautists